The Laois Ladies' Senior Football Club Championship has been running since 1976 - 46 finals. The competition has seen seven clubs winning the title, with St Conleths winning the latest in 2021, captained by Mary Cotter. The final has been played in a number of grounds around the county, often in O'Moore Park (32 times including replays). The cup is named after Lulu Carroll who was one of Laois' greatest ever ladies' footballers. The winners progress on into the provincial championship and Laois has a good record for a small county, having won the Leinster championship on 14 occasions. All-Ireland glory has proven more elusive, however, with The Heath securing Laois' only two titles, in 1985 & 1986.

Key

By Year

By Club

Back-to-back wins

Head-to-Head Matrix

Consecutive Appearances

Top10 All-Time Scorers (Finals)

Top10 Single-Game Scorers (Finals)

 missing scorers: Ballyroan 1-1 (1976), Crettyard 2-4 (1982), Crettyard 0-5 (1995), Timahoe 0-3 (1995), Crettyard 0-2 (2005), Timahoe 0-1 (2007), Sarsfields 0-1 (2007) & Timahoe 0-1 (2015)
 name in italics: the player was on the losing team that year.

Statistics & Notable Scores

 SCORERS
 77 - The overall finals' top scorer is Tracey Lawlor (Sarsfields) who has a total of 4-65 (77pts), scored in 13 finals.
 13 - The top scorer for a single game is Tracey Lawlor (Sarsfields) who hit 2-7 (13pts) in 2014 vs Timahoe.
 12  -The previous record for a single game was set in 2001, and was, amazingly, a joint record where Sue Ramsbottom scored 2-6 and Theresa Swayne scored 4-0 in the same game!
 APPEARANCES
 28 - Crettyard have appeared in a record 28 finals - including a record 26-in-a-row between 1977 & 2002.
 The competition has thrown up many repeated finals where two teams go head-to-head for a number of years in a row. These are: 
Crettyard v The Heath (11 years/12 matches) 1979-1989
Crettyard v Timahoe (13 years/15 matches) 1990-2002
Timahoe v Sarsfields (9 years/10 matches) 2007-2015
Sarsfields v Portlaoise (3 years/3 matches) 2016-2018
 The most common match-ups have been Crettyard v Timahoe (15 finals), The Heath v Crettyard (12 finals) and Timahoe v Sarsfields (11 finals).
 The Heath, in the first final, and St Conleths (2021) are the only teams to have won on their first appearance. The Heath beat Ballyroan in 1976, while St Conleths beat Sarsfields in 2021. All the other teams - Crettyard (1977), Timahoe (1990), Sarsfields (2003), Shanahoe (2004) and Portlaoise (2016) - have lost on their first attempt.
 Sarsfields & Portlaoise are the only sides to lose three finals before winning one. Ballyroan & Timahoe lost two, while Crettyard & Shanhoe both lost one.
 TEAM SCORING
 21 - Sarsfields' 21pt winning margin in 2017 set a new record, beating their old record from 2014, which in turn had bridged a 28 year old gap in beating The Heath's 1986 record of 17pts.
 27 - Sarsfields' 4-15 (27pts) total in 2014 set a new scoring record for the final, beating the previous record of 4-12 (24pts) set in 2001 by Timahoe.
 19 - Crettyard's losing score of 5-4 in 2001 would have won all bar the 1986, 1998, 2014 finals and the 2015 replay. 
 2 - Crettyard also posted the lowest score of any team in the final: 0-2 in 1984.
 5 - The lowest winning score is 5pts - 1978 by Crettyard.
 FINALS SCORING
 43 - The highest scoring final was the 2001 final between Timahoe and Crettyard. Timahoe won 4-12 5-4, a total of 43 points.
 9 - The lowest scoring final was in 1978 when only 9 points were scored between the two teams.
 2 - Only two finals have finished goal-less: 2003 & 2018.
 DRAWS
 5 - There have been five draws: 1989, 1991, 2000, 2006 & 2015.
 17 - 2000 had the highest-scoring draw (17 points each). 
 8 - 1989 had the lowest-scoring drawn game (8 points each).
 10 -Timahoe's win over Crettyard in the 2001 replay was the biggest winning margin in a replay (10 points).
 22 - Sarsfield's 4-10 in 2015 is the highest score in a replay.
 36 - 2015 also had the highest-scoring replay (36 points).
 VENUES
 5 - Sarsfields have won finals in five different venues - their first wins in each venue were: 2008 O'Moore Park, 2013 Ratheniska, 2015 Crettyard, 2016 Portarlington & 2017 Annanough.
 HEAD TO HEAD
 Crettyard are the only team to beat four opponents in finals, while Sarsfields are the only side to lose to four different opponents.

References

Gaelic football competitions in County Laois
Ladies' Gaelic football competitions